Trinadha Rao Nakkina is an Indian film director and screenwriter who works in Telugu cinema. He is known for his films Cinema Choopistha Mava,  Nenu Local and Dhamaka.

Early life and career 
He was born and brought up in Anakapalli (Visakhapatnam), Andhra Pradesh, India. He went to Anakapalli to continue his higher studies. He has had good story narrating skills from his childhood days, finally he made his way to Hyderabad for job hunt, before becoming a film director.

Filmography

References

External links 
 

Telugu film directors
Film directors from Andhra Pradesh
People from Vizianagaram district

People from Visakhapatnam
Telugu screenwriters
Indian screenwriters
Indian film directors
Screenwriters from Andhra Pradesh
21st-century Indian film directors